John Dudley Irvine (born 2 January 1949) was the Dean of Coventry.

Career and ministry
Irvine was a barrister in London before his ordination to the priesthood. He served a curacy at Holy Trinity Brompton and was one of the founders of the Alpha course. Having taken charge of the Alpha course, he played a major part in transforming it from its original four-week form to its current 10-week form.

In 1985, Irvine led the first “church plant” from HTB to St Barnabas Kensington.

Irvine was appointed Dean of Coventry in March 2001. He retired on 29 July 2012.
He took up the position of associate vicar at Holy Trinity, Cambridge, in September 2012.

Styles
 The Reverend John Irvine (1981–2001)
 The Very Reverend John Irvine (2001–present)

References

Church of England deans
Living people
Provosts and Deans of Coventry
1949 births
Holy Trinity Brompton people